Elections to the Sutherland District Council took place on 7 May 1992, alongside elections to the councils of Scotland's various other districts. Independents remained in control of the council, winning all 14 seats. Eight candidates were elected unopposed, and Voter turnout in the contested wards was 38.9%.

Aggregate results

Ward results 
}

References

Sutherland District Council elections
1992 Scottish local elections